is a stone kofun or tumulus of the Asuka period in the east of Shimanoshō, Asuka, Nara Prefecture, Japan. The kofun is believed to be the tomb of Soga no Umako. The kofun is also known as the  Kofun.

Name 
The name of the kofun in Japanese is a combination of two words, the first, meaning "stone", and the second, meaning "stage". The name of the kofun therefore originates in its resemblance to a large stone stage. The Ishibutai kofun has been known by this name at least as early as the Tokugawa period, as evidenced by its entry in the Saigoku sanjūsansho meisho zue, a large guide to Buddhist pilgrimage sites written by Kanenari Akatsuki in 1853.

Association with Soga no Umako 
The Ishibutai Kofun is inferred to be the tomb of Soga no Umako (559? - 626), and his death during the reign of Empress Suiko is recorded in the Nihon Shoki.
Summer, 5th month, 20th day. The Oho-omi died. He was buried in the tomb at Momohama.

The historian and archeologist Sadakichi Kita (1871 - 1939) proposed that the Ishibutai Kofun is the above-mentioned "Momohana" tomb in the Nihon Shoki. Kita also proposed that the earthen mound of the Ishibutai Kofun was removed after Soga no Umako's death as a punishment of the Soga clan by the imperial government.

Structure 

The Ishibutai Kofun was built on a spur of a mountain that falls northeast to a small plateau. It consists of a platform, a gallery entryway, stone walls that form a tomb, two large stones that form a ceiling for the tomb, and embankments on either side of the tomb. In total 30 stones were used to construct the Ishibutai Kofun.

Platform and moat 
The Ishibutai kofun originally occupied a much larger area than is evidenced by the existing stone tumulus. It was built on a square platform, which measured  on each side at the time of construction. Archeological excavations have revealed that the kofun was surrounded by a moat, a feature typical of other kofun of the period.

Approach 
Kofun typically had a stone approach to the entrance path of the tomb. The Ishibutai has a particularly long entrance path, which measures . This entrance was originally covered like the tomb, but its stone ceiling no longer exists.

Tomb 
The Ishibutai kofun is a  corridor-type tomb. Small drainage channels run along the east, north, and west of the tomb. These were constructed to drain water collects on the north side of the tomb to feed south into the shallow drainage channel in the kofun entry.

Ceiling 
The Ishibutai kofun is especially noted for the megaliths that form the ceiling of the tomb. The ceiling of the tomb is formed by two megaliths, one to the north and one to the south.

Mound 
The Ishibutai kofun was originally a large, flat  type kofun; the existing stone structure was covered at the time of construction by a broad, flat earthen mound. This mound eroded slowly after the construction of the kofun, thus exposing the large megaliths of the tomb roof.

Excavation 

The Ishibutai Kofun was first excavated by the archaeologist and academic Kōsaku Hamada (1881－1938). Imperial kofun have not been readily excavated in Japan. Due to its association with Soga no Umako, the Ishibutai tumulus does not have an imperial designation, and has thus seen extensive excavation. The kofun was first excavated in 1933, work on the base and moat began in 1935, and excavation of the tomb continued until 1975.

The Ishibutai Kofun excavation yielded no significant finds. Funerary objects were probably lost to grave robbery quite soon after its construction. Stone shards to the southeast of the tomb are the remains of a tuff sarcophagus. Numerous examples of gilt and bronze implements, as well as earthenware shards were found in the banks of the tomb approach. The excavation also revealed that other similar flat stone kofun were built to the north and south of the existing structure.

The Ishibutai Kofun was designated a historical remain in 1935. As excavation of the Ishibutai Kofun continued after World War II, significant reconstruction of areas around the kofun were carried out. The kofun and its surrounding area is part of the Asuka Historical National Government Park.

Transportation 
The Ishibutai Kofun is accessible from Asuka Station, which is served by the Kintetsu Yoshino Line. The "Kame Bus" (Tortoise Bus), also called the Asuka Tour Bus/Asuka Circle Route Bus, serves all locations within the Asuka Historical National Government Park, and leaves hourly from Asuka Station. Bicycle rentals are also available at numerous points around the station, and cost approximately 1000 yen a day.

Gallery

See also

List of megalithic sites
List of Special Places of Scenic Beauty, Special Historic Sites and Special Natural Monuments

External links
 Kofun
 飛鳥資料館・石舞台古墳　
 飛鳥資料館・馬子の墓

References 

Kofun
Tourist attractions in Nara Prefecture
Special Historic Sites
Buildings and structures in Nara Prefecture
History of Nara Prefecture